This article contains a list of RuPaul's Drag Race All Stars episodes. The television series RuPaul's Drag Race All Stars aired its first season in 2012, and it involves drag queens competing against each other in various different circumstances.

Overview

Episodes

Season 1 (2012)

Season 2 (2016)

Season 3 (2018)

Season 4 (2019)

Season 5 (2020)

Season 6 (2021)

Season 7 (2022)

References 

Lists of American LGBT-related television series episodes
Lists of American reality television series episodes
 
RuPaul's Drag Race All Stars